Mexican-American recording artist DJ Kane has released three studio albums and twenty-two singles, including three as a featured artist.

Albums

Studio albums

Singles

As lead artist

As featured artist

Album appearances
 2003: "The Gambler" (Emilio Navaira featuring DJ Kane)
 2004: "Vicious" (Baby Bash featuring DJ Kane)
 2005: "Break It Down" (A-Gee featuring DJ Kane)
 2005: "Vuelves" (Chicos de Barrio featuring DJ Kane)
 2008: "Sexy Lady (Remix)" (MC Magic featuring DJ Kane)
 2008: "You Stole My Heart" (MC Magic featuring DJ Kane)
 2008: "Perdoname Mamacita" (Ice featuring DJ Kane)
 2008: "My Struggle" (Ice featuring DJ Kane)
 2008: "Muevelo" (Ice featuring DJ Kane)
 2008: "Down for You" (Ice featuring DJ Kane)
 2008: "Mentirosa" (Ice featuring DJ Kane)
 2009: "Moving On" (Johnny Smallz featuring DJ Kane)
 2010: "Esta Noche" (El Lonely featuring DJ Kane)
 2010: "Middle of the Night" (Lucky Luciano featuring DJ Kane)
 2011: "Falsas Promesas" (MC Magic featuring DJ Kane and Herb G)
 2011: "Amame" (Manny D Alesandro featuring DJ Kane)
 2011: "Dame" (K1 featuring DJ Kane)
 2012: "Mommy Said, No" (Dezi B featuring DJ Kane)

References

Discography
Discographies of American artists
Regional Mexican music discographies